The After Party is the second album by the American electronic rock band Ghost Town. It debuted at #1 on the Billboard New Artists and Heatseekers charts. The track You're So Creepy was also on their debut album, Party in the Graveyard.

Track listing

Personnel

Ghost Town 
 Kevin "Ghost" McCullough – vocals, unclean vocals
 Alix "Monster" Koochaki – guitar, backing vocals
 Evan Pearce – keyboards, synthesizers
 Manny "MannYtheDrummer" Dominick – drums, percussion

Production 
 Tom Coyne – mastering
 Serban Ghenea – mixing
 Mike Green – engineering, mixing, producer
 Mike Liguori – A&R
 Jim Monti – mixing
 Evan Pearce – engineering, mixing, producer
 Dave Rath – A&R
 Andy Serrao – A&R

References

Ghost Town (band) albums
2014 albums